AACP may refer to:

 Above-Anvil Cirrus Plume, or overshooting top
 Advanced Airborne Command Post
 American Academy of Cardiovascular Perfusion 
 American Academy of Child Psychiatry, former name of the American Academy of Child and Adolescent Psychiatry
 American Academy of Craniofacial Pain 
 American Association of Colleges of Pharmacy
 American Association of Community Psychiatrists 
 Asian American Curriculum Project
 Australian Association of Consultant Pharmacy, see The Pharmacy Guild of Australia#The Guild Group of Companies